Cemal Esener (1876–1958) was a Turkish general and politician.

References 

1876 births
1958 deaths
20th-century Turkish politicians
Place of death missing
Military personnel from Istanbul
Republican People's Party (Turkey) politicians
Turkish generals
Politicians from Istanbul